Haastaja is the debut studio album by Finnish pop singer Jontte Valosaari. Released on 26 April 2013 by EMI Finland, the album peaked at number 29 on the Official Finnish Album Chart.

Track listing

Charts

Release history

References

2013 debut albums
Jontte Valosaari albums